The Icui is a right tributary of the river Bega in Romania. It discharges into the Bega in Margina.

References

Rivers of Romania
Rivers of Timiș County